The 2004–05 Nemzeti Bajnokság I, also known as NB I, was the 103rd season of top-tier football in Hungary. The league was officially named Arany Ászok Liga for sponsoring reasons. The season started on 7 August 2004 and ended on 26 May 2005.

League standings

Results

Statistical leaders

Top goalscorers

External links
 Official website 
 Hungary - List of final tables (RSSSF)

Nemzeti Bajnokság I seasons
1
Hungary